

Station List

J